The Swiss Figure Skating Championships (officially named  and ) were held in Schaffhausen from December 19-20, 1997. Medals were awarded in several disciplines including men's singles, ladies' singles, and ice dancing.

Senior results

Men

Ladies

Ice dancing

External links
 results

Swiss Figure Skating Championships
Swiss Figure Skating Championships, 1998